Stereolaffs is the comedy record label run by Jon Wurster and Tom Scharpling of the longform radio comedy duo Scharpling and Wurster.

Discography
Rock, Rot and Rule (1999)
Chain Fights, Beer Busts and Service with a Grin (2002)
New Hope for the Ape-Eared (2004)
Hippy Justice (2005)
The Art of the Slap (2007)

See also
 List of record labels

External links
 Stereolaffs

American record labels
Comedy record labels